Jennifer Lauck (born December 15, 1963) is an American fiction and non-fiction author, essayist, speaker and writing instructor.

Early life and education

Lauck is the American author of four books including the New York Times best seller Blackbird. Her writing has been published in the U.S. and around the world, translated into several languages. Much of her popularity began when she appeared on the Oprah Winfrey Show in 2000 and Winfrey held the book up to her audience saying, "This should have been a book of the month book. Read it now."  Blackbird debuted on The New York Times Best Seller list in November 2000, dropping off and then returning in January 2001.

Born in Reno, Nevada, Lauck split her early childhood between the states of Nevada and California, with her adoptive family. After her mother died in 1971, Lauck remained with her adoptive father and brother until her father died in 1973. At that time, Lauck was separated from her adoptive brother and raised in Nevada and Washington state, adopted a second time by the paternal side of her adoptive family.

Professional career

Lauck's adulthood was spent in Washington, Montana and Oregon where she studied journalism at Montana State University and then took a reporting job with the Montana Television Network. Lauck's journalism career took her to Spokane, Washington, where she worked for KXLY-TV, then Portland, Oregon, where she worked for KATU-TV as a news producer and special reports producer. Her reports, investigative journalism, appeared on CNN and the ABC Nightly News. She has been nominated for several Society of Journalists awards and won Best News Story of the year for her report on an abduction case in Washington State.

Lauck discussed her reasons for writing her first and subsequent memoirs with Literary Mama, "...memoir writing was born from the realization that I wanted to have children. I knew I had to go through some deep self-examination before bringing forth a child and I knew traditional avenues of therapy would never give me the insights and relative self-mastery I needed to be a competent mother." The international bestseller Blackbird detailed Lauck's memory of childhood and was followed by her next book, Still Waters, that took her to her 30s and the birth of her first child. In Still Waters, Lauck describes her writing of her second book as attempt to understand the suicide death of her adoptive brother, whom she was separated from as a young girl. She followed Still Waters with a collection of short stories titled Show Me the Way, in which she took a closer look at her parenting of her two children. She also wrote and published essays for Literary Mama and anthology collections on parenting.

Moved by the number of letters received in support for her writing, as well as the sharing of personal tragedies in those fan letters, Lauck felt ill-equipped to respond skillfully and turned to study of Tibetan Buddhism under American masters Anne Klein, Harvey Aronson, Joanna Macy, and Lama Tsultrim Allione, as well as Tibetan master Adzom Rinpoche. While studying Buddhist theory and practicing meditation, Lauck turned her writing toward larger spiritual questions, publishing several essays in Lion's Roar and Buddha Dharma.

In 2007, Lauck continued to explore her life further and discovered the impact of her adoption through studies with adoption experts Nancy Verrier, author of The Primal Wound, and Coming Home to Self, and Betty Jean Lifton, author of several books on the topic of adoption.  After hiring an investigator, Lauck found her original birth family and reunited with them in 2008. Seal Press released her fourth memoir, titled Found: A Memoir & True Sequel to Blackbird, focused on the impact of adoption and Lauck's reunion with her birth family.

Lauck has a BA in journalism from Montana State University and MFA in creative writing from Pacific Lutheran University and has taught writing for 12 years, most recently for The Attic Institute, as a Senior Fellow.  Lauck travels to speak on a variety of topics including motherhood, empowerment of women, writing, adoption, foster care, abandonment, early loss, Tibetan Buddhism, and mediation.

Published work
 Blackbird, (2000)
 Still Waters, (2002)
 September 11th From Abroad, "September 11: West Coast Writers Approach Ground Zero, Jeff Meyers, Editor, Portland, OR: Hawthorne Books & Literary Arts, Inc., 2002
 Show Me the Way, (2004)
 It Takes a Village, "It’s a Boy, Women Writers on Raising Sons," Andrea Buchanan, Editor, Berkeley, CA: Seal Press, 2005
 Not So Perfect, "Literary Mama: Reading for the Maternally Inclined," Andrea Buchanan, Editor, Berkeley, CA: Seal Press, 2006
 Links, "It’s a Girl: Women Writers on Raising Daughters," Andrea Buchanan, Editor, Berkeley, CA: Seal Press, 2006
 Reentry, Buddha Dharma, Spring, 2007
 Reentry, "Best Buddhist Writing 2007," Melvin McLeod, Editor, Boston, MA: Shambala Press, 2007.
 Abducted Vs Adopted, Huffington Post, Feb. 9, 2011.
 Adoption Myth Buster, Huffington Post, Feb. 13, 2011.
 The Memoir Dilemma, Huffington Post, Feb. 21, 2011.
 Super Daughters, Super Powers, Huffington Post, Mar. 6, 2011.
 Forgive the Unforgivable, Huffington Post, Mar. 12, 2011.
 Four Ways to Manage Fear, Huffington Post, Mar. 16, 2011.
 Found, (2011)
 Let it Bee, Lion's Roar, November 2011.
 Let it Bee, "Right Here with You, Bringing Mindful Awareness into Our Relationships," Andrea Miller, Editor: Boston, MA, Lion's Roar, 2011.
 The One Year Marriage, "Knitting Yarns: Writers on Knitting," New York: W. W. Norton & Company, 2013.

Awards and nominations
 Excellence in Journalism, Television, Society of Professional Journalists, 1988
 First Place, General News Reporting, Society of Professional Journalists, 1988
 Blackbird: Oregon Book Awards, Literary Arts, Portland, OR (NOMINATED)
 Blackbird Garden State Teen Book Award (NOMINATED)
 Blackbird Pennsylvania Young Reader's Choice Award (NOMINATED)
 Still Waters: Oregon Book Award, Literary Arts, Portland, OR (NOMINATED)
 Found : Oregon Book Award, Literary Arts, Inc., Portland, OR (NOMINATED)

Appearances
 The Oprah Winfrey Show, Blackbird, October 2000
 The Rosie O'Donnell Show, Blackbird, October 2000
 The Rosie O'Donnell Show, October 2000 for the release of Still Waters, October 2001
 BBC News, Blackbird, 2001
 Radio/TV: Frankfurt Book Fair, 2000/2001
 Radio/TV: Edinburgh, Scotland, 2001
 Radio/TV: Glasgow, Scotland, 2001
 Radio/TV: Denmark, 2001
 Radio/TV: Finland, 2001
 Radio/TV: Netherlands, 2001
 Radio/TV: Sweden, 2001

References

External links 
 http://www.bookreporter.com/authors/au-lauck-jennifer.asp

1963 births
Living people
American memoirists
American television journalists
Montana State University alumni
Pacific Lutheran University alumni
Writers from Reno, Nevada
American women memoirists
American women television journalists
21st-century American women